Oscar Crino (born 9 August 1962) is a former Australian international soccer player who played as a central midfielder. He was an Australian Institute of Sport scholarship holder.

Early life
Crino was born in 1962 in Buenos Aires, Argentina and arrived in Australia with his family in 1972.

Playing career

Club career
Crino played primarily in the National Soccer League with South Melbourne, Footscray JUST and Preston. He also played briefly in Cyprus with Anorthosis Famagusta and in Hong Kong with Tung Sing.

International career
A regular player in the Australian national side through the 1980s Crino played 70 times for the national team, including 37 times in full international match for six goals.

Coaching career
Crino is now coaching in Victorian State League 2NW with Cairnlea FC (www.cairnleafc.com.au).

References

External links
OzFootball profile

1962 births
Living people
Footballers from Buenos Aires
Argentine emigrants to Australia
Australian soccer players
Australian expatriate soccer players
Australia international soccer players
Australia B international soccer players
Olympic soccer players of Australia
Footballers at the 1988 Summer Olympics
National Soccer League (Australia) players
Anorthosis Famagusta F.C. players
South Melbourne FC players
Footscray JUST players
Preston Lions FC players
Expatriate footballers in Cyprus
Australian Institute of Sport soccer players
Australia under-20 international soccer players
Cypriot First Division players
Association football midfielders